Dmitrovo is a rural locality (a selo) and the administrative center of Dmitrovskoye Rural Settlement, Pochepsky District, Bryansk Oblast, Russia. The population was 375 as of 2010. There are 3 streets.

Geography 
Dmitrovo is located 20 km northeast of Pochep (the district's administrative centre) by road. Papsuyevka is the nearest rural locality.

References 

Rural localities in Pochepsky District